Leslie Spann Jr. (May 23, 1932 – January 24, 1989) was an American jazz guitarist and flautist. As a sideman he recorded with Nat Adderley, Benny Bailey, Bill Coleman, Eddie "Lockjaw" Davis, Curtis Fuller, Red Garland, Benny Goodman, Sam Jones, Abbey Lincoln, Charles Mingus, Duke Pearson, Jerome Richardson, Charlie Shavers, Sonny Stitt, Billy Taylor, Randy Weston, and Ben Webster. As a leader he recorded only once, the album Gemini in 1961.

Career
Les Spann was born in Pine Bluff, Arkansas, United States. From 1950 to 1957, he studied music at Tennessee State University. At the end of that time he worked with Phineas Newborn Jr. and in 1958 with Ronnell Bright. The following year, he joined a quintet in New York City led by Dizzy Gillespie, performing solos on flute and guitar and appearing on two of Gillespie's albums for Verve Records. After a year with Gillespie, he went to Europe as a member of Quincy Jones's big band. Two more albums followed, this time with Spann joining a sextet that included Duke Ellington, Johnny Hodges, and Harry "Sweets" Edison. He recorded with Hodges again in 1967. Around 1970, he played flute in a quartet led by the guitarist Kenny Burrell.

He died in New York City in 1989.

Discography

As leader
 Gemini (Jazzland, 1961)

As sideman
With Bill Coleman
 From Boogie to Funk (1960)
 The Great Parisian Session (1960)

With Duke Ellington
 Side by Side (Verve, 1959) with Johnny Hodges
 Back to Back: Duke Ellington and Johnny Hodges Play the Blues (Verve, 1959)
 Paris Blues (United Artists, 1961)

With Dizzy Gillespie
 The Ebullient Mr. Gillespie (Verve, 1959)
 Have Trumpet, Will Excite! (Verve, 1959)

With Johnny Hodges
 A Smooth One (1960)
 Blue Hodge (Verve, 1961)
 Triple Play (RCA Victor, 1967)

With Quincy Jones
 The Birth of a Band! (Mercury, 1959)
 Swiss Radio Days Jazz Series, Vol. 1 1960
 I Dig Dancers (Mercury, 1960)
 At Basin Street East, Billy Eckstine/Quincy Jones (1961)
 Newport '61 (Mercury, 1961)
 The Great Wide World of Quincy Jones (Mercury, 1961)

With Sam Jones
 The Chant (Riverside, 1961)
 Down Home (Riverside, 1962)

With Sonny Stitt
 The Matadors Meet the Bull (Roulette, 1965)
 What's New!!! (Roulette, 1966)
 I Keep Comin' Back! (Roulette, 1966)

With others
 Phineas Newborn, Jr. Plays Harold Arlen's Music from Jamaica, Phineas Newborn Jr. (RCA Victor, 1957)
 Abbey Is Blue, Abbey Lincoln (Riverside, 1959)
 Ben Webster and Associates, Ben Webster (Verve, 1959)
 Big Brass, Benny Bailey (Candid, 1960)
 That's Right!, Nat Adderley (Riverside, 1960) 
 Uhuru Afrika, Randy Weston (Roulette, 1960)
 The Magnificent Trombone of Curtis Fuller, Curtis Fuller (Epic, 1961)
 Kwamina, Billy Taylor (Mercury, 1961)
 Going to the Movies Jerome Richardson (1962)
 One More Time, Wild Bill Davis (1962)
 Solar, Red Garland (Jazzland, 1962)
 The Complete Town Hall Concert, Charles Mingus (Blue Note, 1962 [1994])
 Honeybuns, Duke Pearson (Atlantic, 1965)
 Lock, the Fox, Eddie "Lockjaw" Davis (RCA Victor, 1966)

References

"Les Spann", Grove Jazz online.

1932 births
1989 deaths
Tennessee State University alumni
American jazz guitarists
American jazz flautists
Guitarists from Arkansas
20th-century American guitarists
Jazz musicians from Arkansas
20th-century flautists